California Valley is a valley in Inyo County, California.  It has an elevation of 2582 feet.  It lies between the Nopah Range (to the west and north) and the Kingston Range (to the east and south).

References

Valleys of Inyo County, California